Tynna, possibly also known as Dana, was a town of ancient Cataonia or of southern Cappadocia mentioned by Ptolemy. It was located in the neighbourhood of Faustinopolis, and inhabited through Roman times.

Its site is located near Zeyve, Porsuk, Asiatic Turkey.

References

Populated places in ancient Cappadocia
Populated places in ancient Cataonia
Former populated places in Turkey
Roman towns and cities in Turkey
History of Niğde Province